Stadio Romeo Menti is the name of three stadiums in Italy:

 Stadio Romeo Menti (Vicenza) 
 Stadio Romeo Menti (Castellammare di Stabia)
 Stadio Romeo Menti (Montichiari), home of F.C. Atletico Montichiari